The properties on this List of contributing properties (Oregon Commercial Historic District) are part of the National Register of Historic Places. They joined the Register when the Oregon Commercial Historic District, in Oregon, Illinois, was designated in 2006.

Government
 Columbiad Cannon
 Iron Mike (fountain)
 Oregon City Hall
 Parrott Cannon
 The Soldiers' Monument (Oregon, Illinois)
 U.S. Post Office (Oregon, Illinois)
 War Memorial (Oregon, Illinois)
 Well Pump House

Listed separately
 Old Ogle County Courthouse
 Oregon Public Library

Commercial
 108 N. Fourth St.
 114 N. Fourth St.
 115 S. Fourth St.
 116 N. Fourth St.
 118 N. Fourth St.
 121-123 S. Fourth St.
 125 S. Fourth St.
 127 S. Fourth St.
 129 S. Fourth St.
 137 S. Fourth St.
 302-304 Franklin St.
 131 N. Third St.
 200 N. Third St.
 217 Washington St.
 219 Washington St.
 221 Washington St.
 223 Washington St.
 300 Washington St.
 301-305 Washington St.
 302 Washington St.
 307 Washington St.
 311-315 Washington St.
 314-316 Washington St.
 317-319 Washington St.
 414 Washington St.
 Bemis Motor Company Building
 Ben Franklin Store Building
 C.A.S. Ley Building
 F.G. Jones Block
 Jacobs Block
 Masonic Temple Lodge No. 420
 Oregon Manufacturing Company Building
 Rock River Hotel
 Schiller Piano Company and Iron Water Tower Base
 T. Goings Building
 Union Block Opera House
 Unity Building

Other structures
 Oregon Coliseum

Bank buildings
 Ogle County National Bank Building
 Oregon State Savings Bank Building

Theater buildings
 Oregon Theater
 Lyon Theater

Historic districts in Illinois